Mirassol is a municipality in the state of São Paulo, Brazil.  The city is located in the northern part of the state, 453 km from the city of São Paulo and 15 km from São José do Rio Preto. Mirassol has 60,303 inhabitants (IBGE/2020).

The city belongs to the Microregion of São José do Rio Preto.

Neighbouring places
Mirassolândia, Ipiguá, São José do Rio Preto, Bady Bassitt, Nova Aliança, Jaci, Neves Paulista and Bálsamo

History

The city was founded on September 8, 1910, by Joaquim da Costa Penha, with the name of São Pedro da Mata Una. On November 27, 1919, the village changed its name to Mirassol, being elevated to district.

The city was officially established as a municipality on December 23, 1924.

Economy

Mirassol has a relevant furniture industry, and 30% of the city's GDP comes from the Secondary sector. Commerce and services corresponds to 68% of the Economy.

Demographics

The HDI, measured by the UNDP, was 0.822 in the year 2000. The life expectancy for the city is 75.42 years. The literacy rate, measured in 2000 by SEADE, was 92.35%.

There weren't homicides in the year 2008. In 2007, Mirassol had 1 homicide.

Statistics
Area: 243.80 km2
Urban area: 47.07 km2
Population density: 221.22/km2 (IBGE/2010) - 222.90/km2 (SEADE/2011)
Urbanization: 93.9% (2010)
Sex ratio (Males to Females): 96.35 (2011)
Birth rate: 12.43/1,000 inhabitants (2009)
Infant mortality: 7.56/1,000 births (2009)
Homicide rate: 0.0/100 thousand ppl (2008)
HDI: 0.822 (UNDP/2000)

All statistics are from SEADE and IBGE.

Transportation

The city is linked with the SP-310 (Rodovia Washington Luis) and SP-320 (Rodovia Euclides da Cunha) state highways. Mirassol has an airport for small planes.

Notable people
 André Renato Antoniassi, footballer
 Doriva, former footballer

Sports

Mirassol Futebol Clube, founded in 1925, is the city's football (soccer) club.  The team's stadium is the Estádio Municipal José Maria de Campos Maia, which has a maximum capacity of 14,534 people.

References

External links
  Prefecture of Mirassol

Municipalities in São Paulo (state)